Kentridge may refer to:

People with the surname
 Felicia Kentridge (1930–2015), South African lawyer
 Sydney Kentridge (born 1922), South African lawyer and judge
 William Kentridge (born 1955), South African artist and filmmaker
 Robert William Kentridge (born 1960), British experimental psychologist

Locations
 Kentridge High School, in Kent, Washington, United States